Towing (also titled Who Stole My Wheels?  and Garage Girls) is a 1978 American comedy film written and directed by Maura Smith and starring Jennifer Ashley, Bobby Di Cicco and Sue Lyon.

Cast
Sue Lyon as Lynn
Jennifer Ashley as Jean
Bobby Di Cicco as Tony
J. J. Johnston as Butch
Joe Mantegna as Chris
Mike Nussbaum as Phil
Audrie J. Neenan as Irate Lady
Don DePollo as Pizza Man
Steven Kampmann as Irate Man

Production
According to Joe Mantegna, David Mamet wrote some scenes for the film which never made it in the final product and was paid $200 for his work.

The film was shot in Chicago.

Reception
Richard Christiansen of the Chicago Tribune awarded the film one star and wrote, "But the movie as a whole is so loosely organized and so quirkily edited that none of it makes much sense; and its ending, with a joke involving the late Mayor Richard J. Daley, is sadly outdated."

Roger Ebert awarded the film one and a half stars.

References

External links
 

1970s English-language films